The 2018 AAA Texas 500 was a Monster Energy NASCAR Cup Series race that was held on November 4, 2018, at Texas Motor Speedway in Fort Worth, Texas. Contested over 337 laps – extended from 334 laps due to an overtime finish, on the 1.5 mile (2.4 km) intermediate quad-oval, it is the 34th race of the 2018 Monster Energy NASCAR Cup Series season, eighth race of the Playoffs, and second race of the Round of 8.

Report

Background

Texas Motor Speedway is a speedway located in the northernmost portion of the U.S. city of Fort Worth, Texas – the portion located in Denton County, Texas. The track measures  around and is banked 24 degrees in the turns, and is of the oval design, where the front straightaway juts outward slightly. The track layout is similar to Atlanta Motor Speedway and Charlotte Motor Speedway (formerly Lowe's Motor Speedway). The track is owned by Speedway Motorsports, Inc., the same company that owns Atlanta and Charlotte Motor Speedways, as well as the short-track Bristol Motor Speedway.

Entry list

First practice

Qualifying

Qualifying results

Practice (post-qualifying)

Second practice

Final practice

Race

Stage Results

Stage 1
Laps: 85

Stage 2
Laps: 85

Final Stage Results

Stage 3
Laps: 164

† Kevin Harvick was penalized 40 points and the win is encumbered due to a spoiler infraction post-race.

Race statistics
 Lead changes: 16 among different drivers
 Cautions/Laps: 8 for 37
 Red flags: 0
 Time of race: 3 hours, 21 minutes and 27 seconds
 Average speed:

Media

Television
NBC Sports covered the race on the television side. Rick Allen, Two–time Texas winner Jeff Burton, Steve Letarte and 2000 Texas winner Dale Earnhardt Jr. had the call in the booth for the race. Dave Burns, Marty Snider and Kelli Stavast reported from pit lane during the race.

Radio
PRN had the radio call for the race, which was simulcast on Sirius XM NASCAR Radio.

Standings after the race

Manufacturers' Championship standings

Note: Only the first 16 positions are included for the driver standings.

After the race Kevin Harvick was issued a L1 penalty after the race, his win will not count and he is deducted 40 points as well as his crew and car chief were suspended.

References

2018 in sports in Texas
AAA Texas 500
NASCAR races at Texas Motor Speedway
AAA Texas 500